The Animal World is a 1956 documentary film that was produced, written and directed by Irwin Allen. The film includes live-action footage of animals throughout the world, along with a ten-minute stop motion animated sequence about dinosaurs.

Irwin's intention was to show the progression of life over time, although he noted, "We don't use the word 'evolution.' We hope to walk a very thin line. On one hand we want the scientists to say this film is right and accurate, and yet we don't want to have the church picketing the film."

Dinosaur sequence
The special effects in the film's dinosaur sequence were produced by Ray Harryhausen and Willis O'Brien. Irwin originally planned to film the scenes as a series of static dioramas with plastic models, but Harryhausen suggested that the scenes would be more memorable if they were animated. The dinosaurs that appear include a Stegosaurus, a pair of Ceratosaurus, a Triceratops, a Tyrannosaurus (which doubles as an Allosaurus), and a female Brontosaurus, along with one of her hatchlings.

O’Brien built the dinosaur models and miniature landscapes while the actual animation was performed by Harryhausen.  With the stop-motion dinosaur sequence scheduled for only six weeks of filming,  Harryhausen used two cameras for the sequence to get more footage in less time, and in interviews after his retirement he stated he ran into a “censorship problem” (apparently with the Hays Office) because it was felt the dinosaur fights were too gruesome, even though, as Harryhausen pointed out, the film's live action sequences show fights between lions and gazelles and the like.

For many years, still shots from the segment were included in View-Master slide show reels. Some of the footage was reused for portions of the Night Gallery season 2 episode "The Painted Mirror," as well as in the 1970 film Trog, and the entire sequence was released as an extra on the 2003 DVD release of The Black Scorpion.

Reception
The film ended up with a profit of over $500,000.

Comic book adaptation
 Dell Four Color #713 (August 1956)

Notes

External links
 

1956 films
American documentary films
Films about dinosaurs
Warner Bros. films
Documentary films about dinosaurs
Films directed by Irwin Allen
1956 documentary films
Films produced by Irwin Allen
Films using stop-motion animation
Films adapted into comics
Films scored by Paul Sawtell
1950s English-language films
1950s American films